Kamil Sönmez (4 March 1947 – 20 December 2012) was a Turkish folk singer and actor. He is best known for his folk songs from the Black Sea Region of Turkey.

In 1998, he received the title of "state artist".

He suffered a cerebral hemorrhage on 4 December 2012 and died on 20 December 2012 in Başkent University Istanbul Medical Practice and Research Center.

Filmography

Movies 
 1979 Düşman
 1980 Eşek Şakası
 1981 Deli Kan
 1981 Bizim Sokak
 1984 Sev Ölesiye
 1985 Cilalı İbo Beni Anneme Götür
 1987 Islak Sokak
 1991 Bir Kadın Düşmanı
 2006 Amerikalılar Karadeniz'de 2
 2009 Güneşi Gördüm

TV series 
 1993 Bizim Mahalle, Kamil
 2000 Tirvana
 2002 Kumsaldaki İzler, Hüseyin
 2002 Kınalı Kar, Kamil
 2003 Ölümsüz Aşk, Naci
 2005 Sensiz Olmuyor, Osman Reis
 2006 Karagümrük Yanıyor, Kurban
 2006 Sev Kardeşim, Ahmet Kalabık
 2007 Komedi Dükkanı
 2008 Aşkım Aşkım, Osman
 2008 Küçük Kadınlar
 2009 Hırçın Kız Kadife

References

External links 
 

1947 births
2012 deaths
People from Ordu
State Artists of Turkey
Turkish-language singers
20th-century Turkish male singers
Turkish folk singers
20th-century Turkish male actors
Turkish male television actors
Turkish male film actors